The surplus procedure (SP) is a fair division protocol for dividing goods in a way that achieves proportional equitability. It can be generalized to more than 2=two people and is strategyproof. For three or more people it is not always possible to achieve a division that is both equitable and envy-free.

The surplus procedure was devised by Steven J. Brams, Michael A. Jones, and Christian Klamler in 2006.

A generalization of the surplus procedure called the equitable procedure (EP) achieves a form of equitability. Equitability and envy-freeness can be incompatible for 3 or more players.

Criticisms of the paper 

There have been a few criticisms of aspects of the paper. In effect the paper should cite a weaker form of Pareto optimality and suppose the measures are always strictly positive.

See also 
 Adjusted winner procedure
 Approval voting

References

Fair division protocols
Welfare economics